JAM Productions was a video game developer based in the United States. It created the 1993 first-person shooter Blake Stone: Aliens of Gold, and its 1994 sequel, Blake Stone: Planet Strike.

The company was founded in 1993 by Jim Row and Mike Maynard, former department heads of Gamer's Edge, who were joined by artist and fellow co-worker Jerry Jones. After the company folded, Maynard worked for 7th Level, Ion Storm, Third Law Interactive, TKO Software and later id Software (who originally suggested him to Apogee Software in the first place). Row went to work for several different mobile and security software companies and works at OCEUS Networks, LLC developing solutions for federal and defense clients holding several patents.

The name was created from the initials of the two founders' first names: Jim and Mike.

References 
JAM Productions at MobyGames
The Apogee Legacy #12 - Mike Maynard

Video game development companies
Video game companies established in 1993
Video game companies disestablished in 1994
Defunct video game companies of the United States
American companies established in 1993
American companies disestablished in 1994